La Motte (Gallo: La Mott) is a commune in the Côtes-d'Armor department of Brittany in northwestern France.

Population

Inhabitants of La Motte are called mottérieux in French.

See also
 Communes of the Côtes-d'Armor department

References

Communes of Côtes-d'Armor